The Dieckmann condensation is the intramolecular chemical reaction of diesters with base to give β-keto esters. It is named after the German chemist Walter Dieckmann (1869–1925). The equivalent intermolecular reaction is the Claisen condensation.

Reaction mechanism
Deprotonation of an ester at the α-position generates an enolate ion which then undergoes a 5-exo-trig nucleophilic attack to give a cyclic enol. Protonation with a Brønsted-Lowry acid (H3O+ for example) re-forms the β-keto ester.

Due to the steric stability of five- and six-membered rings, these structures will preferentially be formed. 1,6 diesters will form five-membered cyclic β-keto esters, while 1,7 diesters will form six-membered β-keto esters.

Further reading
Dieckmann, W. Ber. 1894, 27, 102 & 965
Dieckmann, W. Ber. 1900, 33, 595 & 2670
Dieckmann, W. Ann. 1901, 317, 51 & 93

See also
 Claisen condensation
 Gabriel-Colman rearrangement
 Thorpe–Ziegler reaction

References

Intramolecular condensation reactions
Name reactions